Setefano Somoca (born 10 February 1981) is a Fijian rugby union footballer. He currently plays for the Nadroga rugby team and the Fiji national rugby union team and usually plays as a prop. 
He was part of the Fiji team at the 2011 Rugby World Cup where he played in two matches.

References

External links

1981 births
Living people
Fijian rugby union players
Fiji international rugby union players
I-Taukei Fijian people
Rugby union props